Melipotis indomita, the indomitable melipotis, is a moth in the family Erebidae. The species was first described by Francis Walker in 1858. It is found from the West Indies to Mexico, and from Maine, Florida and Minnesota to Texas and California.

The wingspan is 40–55 mm. There are multiple generations per year.

The larvae feed on Prosopis species.

References

Melipotis
Moths of North America
Moths described in 1858